Miss America 1955, the 28th Miss America pageant, was held at the Boardwalk Hall in Atlantic City, New Jersey on September 11, 1954, and marked the first live nationally televised broadcast of the competition on ABC.

Crowned the winner was Lee Meriwether, who later came to fame as co-star of the television series Barnaby Jones and as the character Catwoman in the 1966 film version of Batman, and later, Lily Munster on the television series The Munsters Today.

Results

Awards

Preliminary awards

Other awards

Judges
Grace Kelly

Contestants

References

External links
 Miss America official website

1955
1954 in the United States
1955 beauty pageants
1954 in New Jersey
September 1954 events in the United States
Events in Atlantic City, New Jersey